Laureen Beckles (born 30 August 1958) is a former French athlete, specialising in the sprints.

Biography  
She participated in the 1980 Olympics, in Moscow, where she reached the semi-finals of the 100 meters.

She won two indoor track championship titles in France in the 50 meters in 1981 and the 60 meters in 1980.

Prize list  
 Athletics Indoor Championships France:  
 winner of 50 m  in 1981   
 winner of 60 m  in 1980

Records

References

External links  
 Olympic profile for Laureen Beckles on sports-reference.com

French female sprinters
Athletes (track and field) at the 1980 Summer Olympics
Olympic athletes of France
Athletes from London
People from the London Borough of Islington
English emigrants to France
1958 births
Living people
Olympic female sprinters